François-Vincent Raspail, L.L.D., M.D. (25 January 1794 – 7 January 1878) was a French chemist, naturalist, physician, physiologist, attorney, and socialist politician.

Biography
Raspail was born in Carpentras, Vaucluse. A member of the republican Carbonari society and Freemasonry, where he met François Arago, Victor Schoelcher and Auguste Blanqui, Raspail was imprisoned during Louis Philippe's reign (1830–1848) and was a candidate for presidency of the Second Republic in December 1848. However, he was then involved in the attempted revolt of 15 May 1848 and in March 1849 was again imprisoned as a result. After Louis Napoleon's 2 December 1851 coup, his sentence was commuted to exile, from which he returned to France only in 1862. In 1869, during the liberal phase of the Second Empire (1851–1870), he was elected deputy from Lyons. He remained a popular republican during the French Third Republic after the short-term Paris Commune in 1871.

Raspail died in Arcueil.

His daughter, Marie Raspail (1837-1876), was a freethinker and republican; she was a staunch supporter of her father and died from an illness contracted while caring for him during his time as a political prisoner towards the end of his life.

Scientific achievements
Raspail was one of the founders of the cell theory in biology. He coined the phrase omnis cellula e cellula ("every cell is derived from a [preexisting] cell") later attributed to Rudolf Karl Virchow. He was an early proponent of the use of the microscope in the study of plants. He was also an early advocate of the use of antiseptic(s) and better sanitation and diet. His "Manuel annuaire de la santé 1834" is portrayed in the painting "Nature morte avec oignons/Still life with a plate of onions" by Vincent van Gogh (1889 Kroller-Muller).

Entry into politics
After the revolution of 1830, Raspail became involved in politics. He was President of the Human Rights Society, and was imprisoned for that role. While in prison, he tended sick inmates and studied their diseases. He became convinced of the value of camphor, which he believed worked by killing extremely small parasites – a version of the germ theory of disease.

Later career
Raspail was a candidate for the Presidency of the French Second Republic in December 1848, but came in fourth, losing to Louis-Napoléon Bonaparte (later Napoleon III). He had been involved in the attempted revolt of 15 May 1848, and in March 1849 was again imprisoned as a result. In 1853, Napoleon III commuted his sentence of imprisonment to one of exile. He returned to France from exile in 1862. In 1869 he was elected deputy from Lyon and in 1875 from Marseille. He remained popular and respected during the French Third Republic. The longest boulevard in Paris, in the 7th, 6th and 14th arrondissements, was named Boulevard Raspail in his honor, after which the Raspail Métro station takes its name.

Publications
Essai de chimie microscopique 1830
Nouveau système de chimie organique 1833
Manuel annuaire de la santé 1834, revisued annually
 Le Réformateur (newspaper, published 1834–35)
Lettres sur les Prisons du Paris 1839
Histoire naturelle de la santé 1843
Manuel annuaire de la Santé, ou Médecine et Pharmacie domestiques . Selbstverl., Paris 1845 Digital edition by the University and State Library Düsseldorf

Further reading
Raspail: Scientist and Reformer by Dora B. Weiner (Columbia University Press, 1968)

See also
French demonstration of 15 May 1848

References

External links

François Vincent Raspail in the Encyclopedia of 1848 Revolutions
Bibliopoly listing by A Gerits & Son
Genius and Biographers: The Fictionalization of Evariste Galois (Mentions and quotes Raspail several times)
Who named it – Virchow's law
Timeline for the Cell Theory
archontology.org's page on Napoléon III, gives election results for 1848
An example of the Raspail Simple Chemical Microscope made by Louis Joseph Deleuil 

1794 births
1878 deaths
People from Carpentras
Politicians from Provence-Alpes-Côte d'Azur
French socialists
French Freemasons
Members of the 1848 Constituent Assembly
Members of the 4th Corps législatif of the Second French Empire
Members of the 1st Chamber of Deputies of the French Third Republic
Members of the 2nd Chamber of Deputies of the French Third Republic
19th-century French biologists
19th-century French chemists
French people of the Revolutions of 1848
Burials at Père Lachaise Cemetery
Légion d'honneur refusals